The Loon Lake Mountain Fire Observation Station is a historic fire observation station located on the western end of the Loon Lake Mountains west of Loon Lake in Franklin County, New York in the Debar Mountain Wild Forest. The tower has been unused since 1971, and the stairs have been removed to keep people from climbing it.

The tower is a prefabricated structure built by the Aermotor Corporation and provided a front line of defense in preserving the Adirondack Forest Preserve from the hazards of forest fires.

It was added to the National Register of Historic Places in 2008.

References

External links

The Fire Towers of New York

Government buildings on the National Register of Historic Places in New York (state)
Towers completed in 1917
Buildings and structures in Franklin County, New York
Fire lookout towers in Adirondack Park
Fire lookout towers on the National Register of Historic Places in New York (state)
National Register of Historic Places in Franklin County, New York